Varad is a village in Gujarat state, India, 5 km north of Bardoli.

Varad has a population of approximately 3701 people of various castes, the majority of whom are Patels. The village flourishes with many number of NRI's helping to build the village in many different ways. Varad is also equipped with a mineral water plant which provides clean and safe drinking water for the village and it also has free cold water plant at the middle of village  open for the poor people who can't afford the refrigerator at home they fill water from there its help 300 people in day. help by bhulabhai family from varad.

Agriculture
Agricultural products of the village include sugarcane, rice, and various other seasonal crops.

Geography
It has an average elevation of 22 metres (72 feet). The majority of the area is covered with agricultural land.

References

Villages in Surat district